Saarepeedi is a village in Viljandi Parish, Viljandi County, Estonia. Until October 2013 it was the administrative centre of Saarepeedi Parish. Saarepeedi has a population of 336 (as of 1 January 2010).

References

Villages in Viljandi County
Kreis Fellin